The Silver Bear for Best Leading Performance is an award presented at the Berlin International Film Festival for an outstanding performance in a leading role and chosen by the jury from the films in main competition at the festival. It was first presented in 2021 Festival to replace the Best Actor and Best Actress.

Winners

References

External links 

 Berlinale website

Leading Performance
 
Film awards for lead actor
Film awards for lead actress